The French submarine Caïman was a  built for the French Navy in the mid-1920s. Laid down in August 1924, it was launched in March 1927 and commissioned in February 1928. It was scuttled at Toulon on 27 November 1942 to prevent her capture by the Germans, then raised in February 1943. It was sunk again on 11 March 1944 by Allied aircraft.

Design
Propulsion while surfaced was provided by two  diesel motors and two  electric motors.

Citations

References 

World War II submarines of France
Requin-class submarines
Submarines sunk by aircraft
World War II shipwrecks in the Mediterranean Sea